C50 may refer to:

Vehicles 
Aircraft
 Beechcraft C-50 Twin Bonanza, an American civil utility aircraft
 Douglas C-50, an American military transport

Ships
 , an Admirable-class minesweeper of the Mexican Navy

Surface vehicles
 Courage C50, a French racing car
 Chevrolet C-50, an American medium-duty truck 
 Great Wall Voleex C50, a Chinese compact car
 Honda C50, a Japanese motorcycle introduced in 1966
 JNR Class C50, a Japanese steam locomotive type
 Suzuki Boulevard C50, a Japanese motorcycle introduced in 2005
 C50, an Italian bicycle produced by Colnago
 Series C-50, a model of the Chrysler Imperial car

Other uses 
 Breast cancer
 Caldwell 50, an open cluster
 Giuoco Piano, a chess opening
 Recruiting of Indigenous Workers Convention, 1936 (shelved) of the International Labour Organization
 C-50, an AMD processor implementing the Bobcat microarchitecture
 C50, a Wordtank Japanese language electronic dictionary